On Sunday 24 May 2009, several people in the Guru Ravidass Gurdwara in Vienna, Austria, were attacked by six men carrying knives and guns. Two of the victims were identified as visiting Dera Sach Khand head Niranjan Dass, 68, and another leader, Rama Nand, 57, who suffered multiple gunshot wounds and died the next day in hospital. At least 15 others were injured, including 4 of the attackers, who were in the end subdued by the other worshipers. It was described as a terrorist attack committed by Sikh fundamentalists. The incident sparked riots across northern India.

Claims and denials of responsibility
An email reportedly received by Radio Akash in London, purportedly from the Khalistan Zindabad Force, claimed responsibility for the attack.
The Austriantimes.at reported that a later email purported to be from the Khalistan Zindabad Force denied all involvement in this attack.
The later email appeared to have a scanned copy of KZF’s letterhead and contained a date change in longhand. This cast doubt on its authenticity.
Austriantimes.at also reported that the visiting leaders had been warned for some time of possible violence against them.

A 28 May 2009 Diepresse.com article reported that the identities of the 6 alleged Sikh attackers had been established. Five of the six had been questioned thoroughly, but the last, the alleged leader, was still too ill to interview, having been shot in the head. Of the six, all were males between 24 and 45 and from Punjab and other regions in northern India, two had entered the country illegally, and four had applied for asylum. It reported that Nirajnan Das was "on the road to recovery".  Both the sixth alleged attacker and Niranjan Das were reportedly under heavy guard at the hospital.

An email received by The Tribune newspaper, purported to be from Ranjit Singh Jammu of the KZF, expressed sympathy for the "Ravidassia brotherhood" and denied any involvement.

Akash Radio reported on its web site that it had received, on 29 May 2009, a third email purported to be from the KZF.
In this third email, Akash reports, the KZF stated that "Indian agencies" used its letterhead to deny responsibility, and went on to emphasize that it took responsibility for the attack that resulted in the death of Rama Nand, and that KZF had sent the letter to an Indian newspaper which did not print the claim of responsibility, but which was quick to print the retraction.

Arrest and trial
One of the six suspects detained in connection with the attack was released due to lack of evidence. Four of the six offenders were Non-Resident Indian asylum seekers living in Austria and were identified as Satwinder Singh, 28, Jaspal Singh, 34, Tasum Singh, 45 and Sukhwinder Singh, 28. The other two attackers - Hardeep Singh, 33 and Charnjit Singh, 24, entered Austria illegally, authorities said. Amritpal Singh, a 26-year-old Sikh man of Indian origin, was arrested after a firefight with commandos of the Austrian police who raided his apartment while investigating the murder.

After nearly 11 hours of deliberations, the jury found main defendant Jaspal Singh guilty of shooting Ramanand to death and he received a life-sentence; he was also convicted of attempted murder. Four men were convicted of aiding Singh and were sentenced to between 17 and 18 years, while one was found guilty of attempted coercion and received a 6-month sentence. The prosecutor had alleged that some of the men had travelled to Vienna from Barcelona in Spain with the aim of carrying out their crime.

References

Massacres in religious buildings and structures
Massacres of Sikhs
Terrorist incidents in Europe in 2009
Terrorist incidents in Austria
May 2009 events in Europe
May 2009 crimes
Sikh terrorism in Austria
2009 in Austria
2009 in India
2009 murders in Austria